Georges Sesia (8 July 1924 – 12 May 2016) was a French footballer who played as a striker.

Career
Born in Villerupt, Sesia played for Nancy-Lorraine, FC Nancy, Stade Français Paris, Roubaix-Tourcoing, Strasbourg, Béziers, and Merlebach.

He also made one appearance for the France national team in 1948. At the time of his death on 12 May 2016, aged 91, he was the oldest living former French international player.

References

1924 births
2016 deaths
French footballers
France international footballers
FC Nancy players
Stade Français (association football) players
CO Roubaix-Tourcoing players
RC Strasbourg Alsace players
AS Béziers Hérault (football) players
SO Merlebach players
Ligue 1 players
Ligue 2 players
Association football forwards
EF Nancy-Lorraine players
Sportspeople from Meurthe-et-Moselle
Footballers from Grand Est